The Trade and Development Bank (TDB), formerly the PTA Bank, is a trade and development financial institution operating in eastern and southern Africa. TDB is the financial arm of the Common Market for Eastern and Southern Africa (COMESA), although membership is open to non-COMESA states and other institutional shareholders.

Overview
As of December 2018, TDB was a large financial institution with assets exceeding US$5.56 billion. The bank had 38 shareholders, across two classes of shares, with shareholders' equity in excess of US$1.19 billion.

History
The Eastern and Southern African Trade and Development Bank, also known as TDB, was established on 6 November 1985 under Chapter Nine of the Treaty for the Establishment of the Preferential Trade Area for Eastern and Southern African States, which entered into effect on 2 September 1982 and was subsequently replaced by the Treaty for the Establishment of the Common Market for Eastern and Southern Africa of 1994 that established COMESA. TDB is the financial arm of COMESA.

Shareholders
The membership of the TDB includes twenty-two member states, nineteen of which are COMESA members. The People's Republic of China was the first non-regional member state to join TDB in 2000. The African Development Bank (AfDB) is a major institutional shareholder, alongside eleven other institutional investors, including the Arab Bank for Economic Development in Africa (BADEA) and OPEC Fund (The OPEC Fund for International Development).

The following countries are the African member states of TDB.

Location
The headquarters of TDB are in Bujumbura, Burundi and Ebene, Mauritius. The bank also maintains regional offices in Nairobi, Kenya, Harare, Zimbabwe, Addis Ababa, Ethiopia, and Kinshasa, Democratic Republic of Congo. The Nairobi office serves as both the primary operating hub for TDB and the regional office for Eastern Africa. In June 2022, TDB moved into a new 19-storey skyscraper in the Kilimani neighborhood of Nairobi, that serves as the bank's regional headquarters of the bank's eastern region.

Board of governors
The Board of Governors is the supreme authority of TDB. It is composed of shareholder representatives, with each shareholder designating one representative and one alternate.

Board of directors
The board of directors is responsible for the conduct of the general operations of TDB. As of March 2019, the following were the members of the board of directors.

 Juste Rwamabuga - Chairman and Director
 Gerard Bussier - Director
 Mohamed Kalif - Director 
Mingzhi Liu, Director
 Abdel-Rahaman Taha - Director
 Isabel Sumar - Director 
 Said Mhamadi - Director representing the ADB
Peter Simbani, Director
Christian Rwakunda, Director
Busiswe Alice Dlamini-Nsibande, Director
Admassu Tadesse, Director (Executive)

Management team
As of March 2019, the bank's chief executive officer was assisted by 17 senior managers in running the bank.

Credit rating
In October 2017, the long-term issuer rating of TDB was upgraded to "Baa3" from "Ba1" by Moody's Investors Service. In October 2019, Fitch Ratings affirmed the Long-term Issuer Default Rating of TDB at "BB+" with Stable Outlook.

See also

 East African Development Bank

References

External links

 East Africa: PTA Bank Signs Deal to Finance European Exports to Africa

International organizations based in Africa
International development in Africa
Economy of Africa
Multilateral development banks
Supranational banks
International banking institutions
Development finance institutions